Lilancheng is a town of Yongqing County in central Hebei province, China, located  southeast of the county seat. , it has 30 villages under its administration.

See also
List of township-level divisions of Hebei

References

Township-level divisions of Hebei
Yongqing County